David Howland Bergamini (11 October 1928 – 3 September 1983, in Tokyo) was an American author who wrote books on 20th-century history and popular science, notably mathematics.

Bergamini was interned as an Allied civilian in a Japanese concentration camp in the Philippines with his mother and father, John Van Wie Bergamini, an architect who worked for the American Episcopal Mission in China, Japan, the Philippines and Africa, and younger sister for the duration of World War II.

From 1949 to 1951 Bergamini studied at Merton College, Oxford on a Rhodes Scholarship. In 1951 he joined Time as a reporter; in 1961 he was appointed Assistant Editor of Life magazine.

According to Professor Charles Sheldon of the University of Cambridge, his 1971 book on Japan's Imperial Conspiracy "is a polemic which, to our knowledge, contradicts all previous scholarly work.... Specialists on Japan have unanimously demolished Bergamini's thesis and his pretensions to careful scholarship.

Partial bibliography
 The Fleet in the Window (a novel published in 1961)
 The Universe (Life Nature Library) (1962; revised 1966, 1967)
 Mathematics (Life Science Library) (1963)
 Australia, Its Land and Wildlife (1964)
 The Scientist (Life Science Library) (1965)
 Japan's Imperial Conspiracy (1971), 
 Venus Development (a novel published in 1976)

References

1928 births
1983 deaths
20th-century American novelists
20th-century American male writers
American science writers
American historical novelists
American war novelists
Dartmouth College alumni
20th-century American historians
American male novelists
American male non-fiction writers
Alumni of Merton College, Oxford